Max Hunt (born 1 May 1999) is an English professional footballer who plays as a defender for  club Yeovil Town.

Career

Early career
Born in Chesterfield, Derbyshire, Hunt began his football career in the youth system of Nottingham Forest. After being released by Forest, Hunt joined the academy of non-league side Matlock Town. In 2016, at the age of 16 Hunt was invited to train and subsequently join the academy of Mansfield Town, becoming the second NPL Football Academy graduate to sign for a professional football club. 

Hunt rejected the opportunity to remain with Mansfield Town's under-21 side, to rejoin the academy of Matlock Town with the aim of playing first-team football. Ahead of the 2017–18 season, Hunt became the first Matlock Town academy graduate in ten years to sign a professional contract with the Gladiators. On 9 August 2017, Hunt joined Northern Premier League Division One South side Belper Town on a short-term loan deal. Hunt returned to Matlock in November 2017, and made his debut for the Gladiators against Lancaster City on 2 December 2017.

Derby County
Having previously had a trial with Championship side West Bromwich Albion, Hunt signed for fellow Championship side Derby County in January 2018. Hunt agreed an 18-month contract with the Rams, with the club holding an option to extend the deal by a further 12 months with Hunt initially linking up with Derby's under-23 side.

On 4 September 2019, Hunt joined National League side Aldershot Town on an initial month-long loan. He made his debut for Aldershot in their 2–1 home defeat against Barrow on 7 September 2019, and on his fifth appearance Hunt scored his first goal for the Shots in their 3–1 defeat against Yeovil Town on 24 September 2019. On 10 January 2020, after an initial four-month loan deal Hunt returned to parent club Derby County having made 22 appearances for Aldershot.

Carlisle United
In January 2020, having been recalled from his loan with Aldershot, Hunt signed for League Two club Carlisle United for an undisclosed fee on an 18-month deal. On 18 January 2020, Hunt made his English Football League debut for Carlisle in a 1–1 draw against Oldham Athletic.

On 26 December 2020, Hunt joined National League side Yeovil Town on a one-month loan deal, making his debut the same day in Yeovil's 6–1 away defeat against National League leaders Torquay United.

Yeovil Town
On 27 January 2021, Hunt signed permanently for National League side Yeovil Town for undisclosed terms, signing an 18-month contract.

Career statistics

References

1999 births
Living people
English footballers
Association football defenders
Nottingham Forest F.C. players
Matlock Town F.C. players
Mansfield Town F.C. players
Derby County F.C. players
Aldershot Town F.C. players
Carlisle United F.C. players
Yeovil Town F.C. players
Northern Premier League players
National League (English football) players
English Football League players